Playchess is a commercial Internet chess server managed by ChessBase devoted to the play and discussion of chess and chess variants.  As of February 2011, Playchess has over 31,000 players online, including many internationally titled players who remain pseudo-anonymous and other masters whose identities are known, such as Hikaru Nakamura, Nigel Short and Michael Adams.

Software
ChessBase provides the proprietary Playchess software, which is included with popular computer chess software like Fritz, Junior or Shredder. With the purchase of any of these playing programs, customers get one-year of access to the server. Alternately, users may download the client software, a pared down version of the Fritz GUI. New users may try the server for a short period of time before access requires a serial number. Guests may always log in for free, but have limited access.
The software has functions to try to detect players using the assistance of chess programs (mainly by task switching).
This is a competitor to other commercial servers, such as Internet Chess Club (ICC), World Chess Live (WCL) and the non-commercial Free Internet Chess Server (FICS).

Playchess uses an internal currency called Ducats which can be used to purchase services (chess courses, lectures and interviews). Ducats can be purchased online with a credit card and with PayPal. The current rate is 1 Ducat = €0.10 (excluding VAT)

See also
List of Internet chess servers

References

External links
 
 Chess Base

Internet chess servers
Chess websites